Star Wars: Skeleton Crew is an upcoming American television series created by Jon Watts and Christopher Ford for the streaming service Disney+. It is part of the Star Wars franchise, taking place in the same timeframe as The Mandalorian and its interconnected spin-offs after the events of Return of the Jedi (1983). Skeleton Crew tells a coming-of-age story.

Watts approached Lucasfilm about telling an Amblin Entertainment-style coming-of-age story set in the Star Wars universe, and he was developing the series with Ford by early 2022. It was officially announced that May at Star Wars Celebration, with Jude Law revealed to be starring. Filming had begun by September 2022 in Los Angeles, and wrapped by late January 2023.

Skeleton Crew is scheduled to be released on Disney+ in 2023.

Cast 
 Jude Law

Production

Development 
In February 2022, Production Weekly revealed the existence of an upcoming, untitled Star Wars series that was being developed under the working title Grammar Rodeo. It was later reported that Jon Watts was being considered to direct at least one episode of the series, with Jon Favreau serving as an executive producer after creating the Star Wars series The Mandalorian. The new series was reported to be set during the High Republic era, with a formal announcement planned for Star Wars Celebration in May 2022. In mid-May, Christopher Ford was revealed to have created the series with Watts, with the pair executive producing and Ford serving as writer. The series was also revealed to be set after the events of Return of the Jedi (1983), just like The Mandalorian, and was described as a "galactic version of classic [Amblin Entertainment] coming-of-age adventure films of the '80s".

During Star Wars Celebration at the end of May 2022, the series' title was revealed to be Star Wars: Skeleton Crew. It was confirmed to be set in the same timeframe as The Mandalorian and Ahsoka, with Dave Filoni serving as an executive producer after doing the same on those series alongside Favreau. Another executive producer, Lucasfilm president Kathleen Kennedy, explained that Watts had approached her about making a Star Wars series inspired by the Amblin film The Goonies (1985). Kennedy had served as an executive producer on that film, and said Skeleton Crew "evolved out of that kind of enthusiasm in wanting to tell stories in this space".

In March 2023, it was revealed that Daniel Kwan and Daniel Scheinert had directed at least one episode of the series.

Casting 
With the February 2022 reports, it was believed that the series was looking for four teenage actors and one 30-to-40-year old actor as its series regulars. Casting of the four teenage actors was still underway in May 2022, with Jude Law revealed to be cast in the lead role at the end of the month.

Filming 
Principal photography had been happening for "a few weeks" by early September 2022, at Manhattan Beach Studios in Los Angeles County, under the working title Grammar Rodeo (a reference to The Simpsonss episode "Bart on the Road"). Sean Porter serves as cinematographer. Filming was scheduled to last until December 2022, and was previously expected to begin as early as June 2022. Filming officially wrapped on January 22, 2023.

Release 
Skeleton Crew is scheduled to be released on Disney+ in 2023.

References

External links 

 
 

2020s American drama television series
2020s American television series debuts
Coming-of-age television shows
Disney+ original programming
English-language television shows
Star Wars television series
Television shows filmed in California
Television shows filmed in Los Angeles
Television series by Lucasfilm
Upcoming television series